Hélène Miard-Delacroix (born 5 November 1959) is a French historian and Germanist, specializing in the history of Germany and Franco-German relations. She is a professor at Sorbonne University. Her expertise in research on Franco-German relations and her commitment to scholarly exchange between the two countries found international recognition in 2022 with the Reimar Lüst Prize of the Alexander von Humboldt Foundation for leading international scholars.

Early life and education
Hélène Miard-Delacroix was born in Saint-Mandé, 5 November 1959.

She holds an agrégation in German; a Master of Advanced Studies in International relations from Sciences Po in Paris; and a doctorate and a habilitation to direct research from Paris-Sorbonne University.

Career and research
During the period of 1990-93, Mirard-Delacroix served as a docent at the University of Tours (1990-93), while also teaching at Sciences Po. She served as a docent at Paris-Sorbonne University in 1993-98 and as a professor at École normale supérieure de Lyon between 2003 and 2008. 

Since then, she has held the position of Professor of History and Civilization of Contemporary Germany at the UFR of Germanic and Nordic Studies of Sorbonne University. She is attached to the UMR SIRICE 8138, a research laboratory on the history of international relations, and is president of the GIP CIERA.

Her fields of research include the history of Germany since 1945; political, economic and social life in contemporary Germany; as well as Franco-German relations and European integration. In this capacity, she participates as an expert and is a consultant for the media (such as Arte, Radio France, France 5, and France 24). 

Her work on Franco-German relations is marked by the desire to go beyond comparatism to write a mixed history that accounts for the entanglements and interactions between the two countries. She thus continues the cross-history approach adopted in her volume on the history of Franco-German relations since the Élysée Treaty, published in 2011, . Some of her works, carried out in the context of collective opening of public archives, reassess dynamics in the last decades of the Cold War and reconsider achievements concerning bilateral negotiations and Germany's role in European construction. Her current research focuses on the history of emotions in international relations. 

Miard-Delacroix is a member of numerous scientific boards of German and French research institutions. In the 2010s, she was a member of the Scientific Advisory Board of the German Historical Institute Paris, and later as President of the Scientific Advisory Board of the Bundeskanzler-Willy-Brandt-Stiftung, and Vice President of the Scientific Advisory Board of the Institute of Contemporary History based in Munich and Berlin. 
 She is currently a member of the scientific advisory board of the Haus der Geschichte in Bonn, the House of European History in Brussels, the François Mitterrand Institute, IFRA-SHS in Frankfurt, and the Centre Ernst Robert Curtius (CERC) at the University of Bonn.

In Germany, she is a member of the KGParl  (Commission for the History of Parliament and Political Parties), Berlin. Since 2020, she has been a member of the Senate of the Leibniz Association, one of the German steering bodies for non-university research. 

Her list of publications includes several monographs, editorships of books, and about 100 contributions to collectives or articles in peer-reviewed journals. Since 2015, Miard-Delacroix has been an appointed co-editor of the journal  (AAPD) (Diplomatic Acts of the Federal Republic of Germany), Berlin.

Awards and honours
 1991, Prix Strasbourg, doctorate thesis
 2012, Prix Maurice Baumont, Académie des Sciences morales et politiques
 2017, Prix international de la recherche, Fondation Max Weber
 2022, Reimar Lüst Prize, Alexander von Humboldt Foundation

Distinctions
 2007, Knight, Ordre des Palmes académiques
 2010, Knight, Order of Merit of the Federal Republic of Germany
 2018, Knight, Académie des Sciences Morales et Politiques

Selected works

Books
Ennemis héréditaires ? Un dialogue franco-allemand, with Andreas Wirsching, Paris, Fayard, 2020
Von Erbfeinden zu guten Nachbarn. Ein deutsch-französischer Dialog, with Andreas Wirsching, Stuttgart, Reclam, 2019
Willy Brandt, Life of a Statesman, London, New-York, I.B. Tauris, 2016
Willy Brandt, Paris, Fayard, 2013
Le défi européen. Histoire Franco-allemande de 1963 à nos jours, Lille-Villeneuve d’Ascq, Presses du Septentrion, 2011.
Deutsch-französische Geschichte 1963 bis in die Gegenwart. Im Zeichen der Europäischen Einigung. Band 11, Darmstadt, Wissenschaftliche Buchgesellschaft, 2011.
Question nationale et nationalisme. Perceptions françaises d’une problématique allemande au début des années cinquante, Lille-Villeneuve d’Ascq, Presses du Septentrion, 2004.
Allemagne, with Alfred Grosser, Paris, Flammarion, collection Dominos, 1994.
Partenaires de choix ? Le Chancelier Helmut Schmidt et la France, Berne, Paris, New York, Peter Lang, 1993.

Notes

References

External links
 CV, via Sorbonne University, 2022

1959 births
Living people
Chevaliers of the Ordre des Palmes Académiques
Sorbonne University
Sciences Po alumni
French academics
French editors
21st-century French historians
21st-century French non-fiction writers
French women historians
21st-century French women writers
Germanists